There are 52 state parks in the U.S. state of Arkansas, as of 2019. The state parks division of the Arkansas Department of Parks, Heritage, and Tourism is the governing body and operator of all parks, although jurisdiction is shared with other state agencies in a few cases.

The first Arkansas state park, Petit Jean State Park, opened in 1923 following an unsuccessful attempt by a lumber company to donate the Seven Hollows and canyon areas to the federal government as a National Park. Stephen Mather deemed the parcel too small in 1921, but the Arkansas General Assembly passed Act 276, allowing the Commissioner of State Lands to accept donations of land for public use.

The list gives an overview of Arkansas state parks and a brief history of their development since the first park opened in 1923.

See also

List of U.S. national parks

References

 
Arkansas state parks
State parks